The 2023 Coosa Valley Open was a professional tennis tournament played on indoor hard courts. It was the second edition of the tournament which was part of the 2023 ATP Challenger Tour. It took place in Rome, Georgia, United States between 20 and 26 February 2023.

Singles main draw entrants

Seeds

 1 Rankings as of February 13, 2023.

Other entrants
The following players received wildcards into the singles main draw:
  Ryan Harrison
  Alex Michelsen
  Nathan Ponwith

The following player received entry into the singles main draw using a protected ranking:
  Christian Harrison

The following players received entry into the singles main draw as alternates:
  Daniel Cukierman
  Illya Marchenko

The following players received entry from the qualifying draw:
  Gabriele Brancatelli
  Sebastian Fanselow
  Toby Kodat
  Patrick Kypson
  Keegan Smith
  Coleman Wong

Champions

Singles 

  Jordan Thompson def.  Alex Michelsen 6–4, 6–2.

Doubles 

  Luke Johnson /  Sem Verbeek def.  Gabriel Décamps /  Alex Rybakov 6–2, 6–2.

References

Coosa Valley Open
Coosa Valley Open
February 2023 sports events in the United States
2023 in sports in Georgia (U.S. state)